Nannaya Bhattaraka (sometimes spelled Nannayya or Nannaiah; ca. 11th century) was a Telugu poet and the author of the first Andhra Mahabharatam, a Telugu retelling of the Sanskrit-language Mahabharata. This work, which is rendered in the Champu style, is chaste and polished and of a high literary merit.

Nannaya is the first of the three earliest known Telugu poets, called the Kavitrayam ("trinity of poets").  The advanced and well-developed language used by Nannaya suggests that prior Telugu literature other than royal grants and decrees must have existed before him. However, these presumed works are now lost, and Nannaya is considered the first poet (adi kavi) of Telugu language. Legends also credit him with writing the Sanskrit-language Andhra-shabda-chintamani, said to be the first work on Telugu grammar, but these legends are historically inaccurate, and the text is an imagnary work.

Grammar 

Some legends credit Nannaya with writing Andhra-shabda-chintamani ("Magic Jewel of Telugu Words"), a Sanskrit-language work that was the first treatise on Telugu grammar. This lost work is said to have contained five chapters with 82 verses in the Arya metre. Nannaya is said to have written this text with help of his friend Narayana Bhatt; Scholar and poet K. Ayyappa Paniker states that both these scholars are believed to be of Kannada origin. Nannaya's grammar is said to have been divided into five chapters, covering samjnā, sandhi, ajanta, halanta and kriya.

Yelakuchi Bala-sarasvati wrote a Telugu gloss (commentary) on this work, and his Bala-sarasvatiyamu refers to this legend in brief. A more elaborate version of the legend appears in Appa-kavi's Appakavīyamu (1656). According to this version, Bhimana, who was jealous of Nannaya, stole and destroyed Andhra-shabda-chintamani by throwing it in the Godavari River. Unknown to others, King Rajaraja-narendra's son Saranga-dhara, an immortal siddha, had memorized Nannaya's grammar. He gave a written copy of Nannaya's work to Bala-sarasvati near Matanga Hill (at Vijayanagara), and Bala-sarasvati wrote a Telugu gloss (commentary) on the work. With help of the god Vishnu, Appa-kavi received a copy of Nannaya's work, and wrote Appakavīyamu as a commentary on this text. Ahobala-panditiya (also known as Kavi-shiro-bhushana), a Sanskrit commentary on Andhra-shabda-chintamani, also retells this story.

While some of the grammatical sutras in Appa-kavi's work may be from Nannaya's time, Andhra-shabda-chintamani is an imaginary work, and was probably fabricated by Bala-sarasvati himself. Although Appa-kavi describes his work as a commentary, it is really an original work.

See also
Telugu Literature
Kavitrayam
Adikavi Nannaya University
About Nannaya Bharatham By Dr. Garikapati

References

Sources
 History and Culture of Andhra Pradesh, P. R. Rao
 Andhrula Saanghika Charitra, Pratapareddy Suravaram
 Andhra Vagmaya Charitramu, Dr. Venkatavadhani Divakarla
 Andhra Pradesh Darshini, Parts 1 and 2, Chief Editor Y. V. Krishnarao

Telugu poets
Telugu writers
11th-century Indian writers
Indian male writers
People from Rajahmundry
Writers from Andhra Pradesh
Sanskrit–Telugu translators